SonarQube (formerly Sonar) is an open-source platform developed by SonarSource for continuous inspection of code quality to perform automatic reviews with static analysis of code to detect bugs and code smells on 29 programming languages. SonarQube offers reports on duplicated code, coding standards, unit tests, code coverage, code complexity, comments, bugs, and security recommendations.

SonarQube can record metrics history and provides evolution graphs. SonarQube provides fully automated analysis and integration with Maven, Ant, Gradle, MSBuild and continuous integration tools (Atlassian Bamboo, Jenkins, Hudson, etc.).

Overview 
SonarQube includes support for the programming languages Java (including Android), C#, C, C++, JavaScript, TypeScript, Python, Go, Swift, COBOL, Apex, PHP, Kotlin, Ruby, Scala, HTML, CSS, ABAP, Flex, Objective-C, PL/I, PL/SQL, RPG, T-SQL, VB.NET, VB6, and XML. As of December 2021, analyzing C, C++, Obj-C, Swift, ABAP, T-SQL and PL/SQL is only available via a commercial license.

SonarQube is available for free under the GNU Lesser General Public License. An enterprise version for paid licensing also exists, as well as a data center edition that supports high availability.

SonarLint 
SonarQube integrates with Eclipse, Visual Studio, Visual Studio Code, and IntelliJ IDEA development environments through the SonarLint plug-ins, and also integrates with external tools like LDAP, Active Directory, GitHub, and others. SonarQube is expandable with the use of plug-ins.

Reception
In 2009, SonarQube received a Jolt Award under testing tools category.

See also

 List of tools for static code analysis

References

External links
 SonarQube Web Site
 SonarQube Android App

Static program analysis tools
Free software testing tools